The  is the canonical list of Japan's three most celebrated scenic sights, attributed to 1643 and scholar Hayashi Gahō.  In 1915, modeled on the old Three Views of Japan, Jitsugyo no Nihon Sha (株式会社実業之日本社) held a national election to determine a list of New Three Views of Japan.  The  is the canonical list of Japan's three most celebrated scenic night views. In April 2003, the New Three Major Night Views of Japan and the 100 Night Views of Japan Club (新日本三大夜景・夜景100選事務局), a nonprofit organization, formed a selection committee and, together with its members, selected by vote the New Three Major Night Views of Japan (新日本三大夜景), modeled on the traditional list of Three Major Night Views of Japan. In August 2004, they also announced the 100 Night Views of Japan (夜景百選).

Three Views of Japan

The views are of the eponymous pine-clad islands of Matsushima in Miyagi Prefecture; the pine-clad sandbar of Amanohashidate in Kyoto Prefecture; and Itsukushima Shrine in Hiroshima Prefecture. All three are designated Special Places of Scenic Beauty, while Itsukushima is also a Special Historic Site and a UNESCO World Heritage Site.

Coordinates

These are the coordinates of the Three Views of Japan.

 Matsushima Bay, Miyagi Prefecture 
 Amanohashidate, Kyoto Prefecture 
 Itsukushima (Miyajima), Hiroshima Prefecture

Gallery

New Three Views of Japan
The New Three Views of Japan are:
 Ōnuma (大沼), a big pond in Ōnuma Quasi-National Park, which is at the town Nanae and the east side of Oshima Peninsula in southwest Hokkaidō
 Miho no Matsubara (三保の松原), a pine grove in the Miho Peninsula, in the Shimizu-ku area of Shizuoka
 Yabakei (耶馬渓), a section of river and valley at the upstream and midstream of Yamakuni River (山国川), in Nakatsu, Ōita, Kyūshū

Gallery

Three Major Night Views of Japan
The Three Major Night Views of Japan are:
 Hakodate seen from Mount Hakodate in Hokkaido
 Kobe and Osaka Bay seen from Maya Mountains in Hyōgo Prefecture
 Nagasaki seen from Mount Inasa in Nagasaki Prefecture. 

All three are called ten million dollar night views, while Michelin Green Guide: Japan gave the Mount Hakodate experience 3/3 stars in a review, placing it as equal to mountain views of Naples and Hong Kong.

Gallery

New Three Major Night Views of Japan

The New Three Major Night Views of Japan are:

Views of Kitakyushu from Mount Sarakura (皿倉山), a mountain in Kitakyūshū Quasi-National Park, which is at the city of Kitakyushu in Fukuoka Prefecture, Kyūshū.
Views of Nara from Mount Wakakusa (若草山), a mountain located in the east of Nara Park.
Views of Kōfu Basin from Yamanashi Fuefukigawa Fruit Park (山梨県笛吹川フルーツ公園), a city park in Yamanashi, Yamanashi Prefecture.

Gallery

See also
 List of Special Places of Scenic Beauty, Special Historic Sites and Special Natural Monuments
 100 Landscapes of Japan (Heisei era)
 100 Landscapes of Japan (Shōwa era)
 100 Soundscapes of Japan
 Three Great Gardens of Japan
 Tourism in Japan
 UNESCO World Heritage Sites in Japan
 Thirty-six Views of Mount Fuji (disambiguation)

References

External links

 Official website of Nihon-Sankei, the three most scenic spots of Japan 
 Yakei official site 
 Fruit Park Fujiya Hotel official website 

Tourism in Japan
Tourist attractions in Miyagi Prefecture
Tourist attractions in Kyoto Prefecture
Tourist attractions in Hiroshima Prefecture
Tourist attractions in Hokkaido
Tourist attractions in Hyōgo Prefecture
Tourist attractions in Nagasaki Prefecture
Tourist attractions in Yamanashi Prefecture
Tourist attractions in Nara Prefecture
Tourist attractions in Fukuoka Prefecture
1643 in Japan
1915 in Japan
2003 in Japan
2004 in Japan